Marc Ortner (born 17 March 1998) is an Austrian football player. He plays for SV Spittal/Drau.

Club career
He made his Austrian Football First League debut for Floridsdorfer AC on 21 July 2017 in a game against SC Austria Lustenau.

References

External links
 

1998 births
Living people
Austrian footballers
Austria youth international footballers
Floridsdorfer AC players
SK Austria Klagenfurt players
SV Spittal players
2. Liga (Austria) players
Association football defenders